The 1986 Southern Conference baseball tournament was held at Hennon Stadium on the campus of Western Carolina University in Cullowhee, North Carolina, from April 27 through 29. The South Division's top seed  won the tournament and earned the Southern Conference's automatic bid to the 1986 NCAA Division I baseball tournament.

The tournament used a double-elimination format.

Seeding 
The top two teams from each division based on regular season conference winning percentage participated in the tournament. The top seed from the North Division played the second seed from the South in the first round, and vice versa. The winners of the first round then played, while the losers played an elimination game. There were no ties in the standings, so no tiebreakers were necessary.

Bracket

Most Outstanding Player

References 

Tournament
Southern Conference Baseball Tournament
Southern Conference baseball tournament
Southern Conference baseball tournament